Zdeněk Hruška (born 25 July 1954 in Prague) is a former Czechoslovak footballer and an active football manager. As a goalkeeper who spent the longest part of his career with Bohemians Prague Hruška had 24 appearances for Czechoslovakia and participated at the 1982 FIFA World Cup.

Playing career
Hruška started his career at Slavoj Vyšehrad which he left in 1974 in order to undergo a 2 years of military service. From 1976 he played in the goal for Bohemians Prague where he in 1982 won the Czechoslovakia cup and in 1983 became champion of Czechoslovakia. His biggest achievement in European cups came in 1983 when Bohemians reached the UEFA Cup semifinals. After nine years with Bohemians he left in 1985 for Slavia Prague where he spent two years. In the season of 1987/1988 he played for Veria FC in the Greek Super League. After that he returned to Bohemians but after a single season in Prague he left again and went to Wacker/Groß Viktoria in the Austrian Regional league.  In 1990 Hruška transferred to FAC Viktoria Wien where he retired from playing.

In the top league of Czechoslovakia Hruška played a total of 247 games.

National team
Hruška had his debut in the Czechoslovakia national team on 9 December 1977 in a friendly against Hungary. He missed the 1980 European Cup due to an injury. He didn't do very well in the first game for Czechoslovakia at the 1982 FIFA World cup where Czechoslovakia made a disappointing draw with Kuwait. Stanislav Seman replaced him in goal in the following match against England. Hruška played his last game (from a total of 24) as Czechoslovakia played a 1:1 draw against Romania on 30 November 1983.

Manager career
From 1992 Hruška was an assistant manager at Bohemians Prague, in 1995 he was appointed as general manager. His next stations included FC Turnov in the fourth league and VT Chomutov in the third league.  In the 1997/98 season he was a co-manager for Slovan Liberec, from 1999 until 2001 he worked as a goalkeeper trainer for Tennis Borussia Berlin in Germany.  Later he took up the Prague team FSC Libuš, returned to Bohemians Prague and after being fired just a few months later, returned to managing FSC Libuš again.

References

External links
 Player profile on the Bohemians Prague web page (in Czech)
 Player statistics in international games

1954 births
Living people
Czech footballers
Czech football managers
1982 FIFA World Cup players
Czechoslovak footballers
Czechoslovakia international footballers
SK Slavia Prague players
Veria F.C. players
Expatriate footballers in Greece
Expatriate footballers in Austria
Czechoslovak expatriate footballers
Czechoslovak expatriate sportspeople in Austria
Czechoslovak expatriate sportspeople in Greece
Association football goalkeepers
Footballers from Prague